Gunnamakhi (Dargwa: Гъуннамахьи) is a rural locality (a selo) in Kassagumakhinsky Selsoviet, Akushinsky  District, Republic of Dagestan, Russia. The population was 57 as of 2010.

Geography 
Gunnamakhi is located 37 km south of Akusha (the district's administrative centre) by road, on the Khunikotta River. Kassagumakhi is the nearest rural locality.

References 

Rural localities in Akushinsky District